Daniela Kotschová (born 19 September 1985 in Poprad) is a Slovak cross-country skier.

Kotschová competed at the 2014 Winter Olympics for Slovakia. She placed 55th in the qualifying round in the sprint, failing to advance to the knockout stages. She also teamed with Alena Procházková in the team sprint, finishing 7th in their semifinal and failing to advance.

As of April 2014, her best showing at the World Championships is 66th, in the classical sprint in 2013.

Kotschová made her World Cup debut in March 2008. As of April 2014, her best finish is 48th, in a freestyle sprint race at Düsseldorf in 2008–09. Her best World Cup overall finish is 60th, in 2013–14. Her best World Cup finish in a discipline is 34th, in the sprint in 2013-14.

Cross-country skiing results
All results are sourced from the International Ski Federation (FIS).

Olympic Games

World Championships

World Cup

Season standings

References

External links

1985 births
Living people
Olympic cross-country skiers of Slovakia
Cross-country skiers at the 2014 Winter Olympics
Sportspeople from Poprad
Slovak female cross-country skiers